There's No Stopping Your Heart is the fifth solo studio album by American country music singer Marie Osmond. It was her first album in seven years and her first album on Capitol/Curb records. It was originally released in 1985 and later reissued in 1990.

Background
Osmond had taken nearly seven years off from recording before releasing There's No Stopping Your Heart. Osmond's previous albums were released when she was a teenager, however this became her first album to be released as an adult. Four singles were released, including two number 1 hits on the billboard hot country songs chart.
Although the first single, "Until I Fall in Love Again" only reached number 54 on the country singles charts it was the follow-up single "Meet Me in Montana," (a duet with Dan Seals) that landed her in the number 1 position.  This was her first number 1 hit since her debut of "Paper Roses" in 1973.  The success continued with the release of the title track which also went to number 1. The fourth and final single, "Read My Lips," peaked at number 4 in 1986.

The album spent 43 weeks on the billboard top country album charts and reached a peak position at number 16.

The album mainly consists of country pop ballads. The album is now available as a digital download from most major online music services.

Track listing

Charts

Weekly charts

Year-end charts

Singles

References

1985 albums
Marie Osmond albums
Curb Records albums
Albums produced by Paul Worley
Capitol Records albums